The script command is a Unix utility that records a terminal session. It dates back to the 1979 3.0 BSD.

Usage 
A script  session is captured in file name  by default; to specify a different filename follow the  command with a space and the filename as such: .

The recorded format of  consists of plain-text timing information (for the whole session) and verbatim command output, including whatever ANSI escape code the program has printed for formatting. It uses a pseudoterminal for this purpose, so programs act exactly as if they were on a terminal. The util-linux  command offers a replay function to its script, which supports using an extra timing file for character-level information. Some online services, such as the now-defunct shelr.tv, can also show the format as a low-bandwidth alternative to video screencasts.

Problems with script 
One of the problems with the script command is that it only allows logging of a child process; and often there is a need to log the command in the current process without spawning a new process, such as when automation of a script is needed that can log its own output.  The Unix operating systems make this possible by use of pipes and redirects. Consider the following model examples:

Bourne shell
All shells related to Bourne shell (namely: sh, bash, and ksh) allow the stdout and stderr to be attached to a named pipe and redirected to the  tee command.

Example
LOGNAME="script"
rm -f $LOGNAME.p $LOGNAME.log
mknod $LOGNAME.p p 
tee  <$LOGNAME.p $LOGNAME.log &
exec >$LOGNAME.p 2>&1

The above script records to  all output of the  command.  However, some interactive programs (such as python) do not echo their standard input when run under the resulting shell, although they do when run under the script command, again due to the detection of a terminal.

Alternatives to Script Command
The ttyrec program from 2000 provides the same kind of functionality and offers several bindings. The timing is similar to util-linux. A more modern take on the concept is "asciicast" JSON, used by asciinema.

See also 
 Command line interpreter
 Shebang (Unix)
 Bourne shell
 Bourne-Again shell
 C shell
 Python (programming language)
 Filename extension, Command Name Issues section
 Perl
 Scripting language
 Unix shell

References 

Unix software